The Rammstein Stadium Tour is the seventh concert tour by German Neue Deutsche Härte band Rammstein, originally in support of their 2019 untitled studio album, but then Zeit as well in 2022 and 2023, with a total of 58 shows in 2019. It grossed more than $64,000,000 by the end of 2018 in pre-sales.

Background 
On 2 November 2018, Rammstein announced that they will tour again, with tour dates, this time in stadiums. Along with that in the following days a few teasers were uploaded to the band's social media channels containing studio snippets from the yet unreleased song "Ramm4", that the band played on their recent tours in 2016–17.

The presale tickets were available from 5 November 2018 and were available to the public from 7 November 2018. Most of the venues sold out within days. And in the following days the band added a few other shows to sold-out events, mostly to the following day. On 10 April 2019, a limited number of tickets were available in some venues, due to the new single, "Deutschland", getting released.

On 24 June 2019, Rammstein added a teaser – including names of cities – on their social media pages which revealed that they will continue their European stadium tour in 2020. On 26 June, the band added another teaser, this time revealing Europe dates and venues, as well as mentioning that a US tour will be announced at a later date. Ticket sales started on 5 July. Rammstein released a teaser image for their next UK performance of 2020 on 26 July 2019 using a photo of what looked like a Welsh Rugby Union jersey with a Rammstein logo, draped over some stadium seating. Fans speculated that this was the Principality Stadium in Cardiff. It was then confirmed by the band when they made the official announcement that they would be playing the Cardiff stadium on 14 June 2020. This will be their first show in Wales since July 2005. As per the most recent announcement, the shows planned for 2020 will not take place due to the 2019–20 coronavirus outbreak, but were preliminarily postponed into 2021, and then postponed again into 2022. On May 12, 2021 the band announced four additional shows, as well as postponing the American dates to 2022 on 24 May 2021.

Development
The set list of the tour saw notable performances, with "Heirate mich" and "Rammstein" being performed for the first time in 18 and 14 years, respectively. Additionally, regularly played staple songs "Keine Lust" and "Feuer frei!" were excluded from the set list for the first time. The 2022 set list features new pieces from Zeit in place of "Was ich liebe", "Tattoo", "Sex", "Diamant" and "Ohne dich" respectively, as well as ending with "Adieu" as opposed to "Ich will".

2019 Set list 

 "Music for the Royal Fireworks" 
 "Was ich liebe"
 "Links 2 3 4"
 "Tattoo"
"Sex" (Removed after the show in Barcelona)
 "Sehnsucht"
 "Zeig dich"
"Mein Herz brennt"
"Puppe"
"Heirate mich"
"Diamant"
"Deutschland" 
 "Deutschland"
 "Radio"
 "Mein Teil"
 "Du hast"
 "Sonne"
 "Ohne dich"
First Encore
"Engel" 
 "Ausländer"
 "Du riechst so gut"
 "Pussy"
Second Encore
"Rammstein"
"Ich will"
"Sonne (Piano Version)" / "Haifisch (Haiswing RMX)"

2022 Set list 

 "Music for the Royal Fireworks" 
 "Armee der Tristen"
 "Zick Zack"
 "Links 2 3 4"
 "Sehnsucht"
 "Zeig dich"
"Mein Herz brennt"
"Puppe"
"Heirate mich"
 "Zeit"
"Deutschland" 
 "Deutschland"
 "Radio"
 "Mein Teil"
 "Du hast"
 "Sonne"
First Encore
"Engel" 
 "Ausländer"
 "Du riechst so gut"
 "Pussy"
Second Encore
"Rammstein"
"Ich will"
"Adieu"
Third Encore
"Te quiero puta! " (Performed only at the final three concerts in Mexico City)
"Sonne (Piano Version)" / "Haifisch (Haiswing RMX)" / "Ohne dich (Piano Version)

Concert synopsis

The show begins with "Music for the Royal Fireworks" played over the speakers, as a screen rises up above the stage. As the music builds to a crescendo, Rammstein's stylised R logo flashes onto the screen, as Christoph walks on stage to his drums, and there is an explosion of pyrotechnics. The rest of the band then emerges from the bottom of the stage, Richard first, then Paul, followed by Ollie and Flake, and finally Till, clad in a snakeskin military uniform, complete with jacket and boots. They then launch straight into "Was Ich liebe", during which black smoke is rising from the stage and delay towers. Next up, Till discards his jacket, and the band continues with "Links 2-3-4". Red banners with the Rammstein logo are revealed across the stage when the song kicks in. As the band start playing "Tattoo", Till then takes off his shirt, revealing a vest top underneath. After "Sehnsucht" and "Zeig Dich", Till begins singing "Mein Herz Brennt", but tricks the audience into singing the hook at the wrong time, before the band starts playing the hook properly. As the band starts playing "Puppe", Till then goes under the stage, and comes back pushing an enormous metal pram. He then puts on a camera that goes over his eye, and looks inside the pram, to reveal a deformed baby doll with its mouth stuck in a scream. During the chorus, flames erupt from the pram, and black confetti falls down on the audience. The pram is then moved off stage, and the band continues with "Heirate mich" and "Diamant". Afterwards, the band leaves the stage, as Richard ascends the stage on a mechanised platform, and starts playing his remix of "Deutschland" on a DJ deck. After a few minutes, Paul, Christoph, Ollie and Flake walk on stage wearing identical hooded suits, which light up as they put their hoods up, and dance around the stage. Afterwards the platform descends, the band come back in their normal clothes, and play the regular version of "Deutschland". After an energetic performance of "Radio", Till and Flake disappear offstage. As the rest of the band start playing "Mein Teil", Till comes back in a bloodied chef's outfit, wheeling a huge cooking pot. He then lifts the lid to reveal Flake inside, playing his keyboard. Till then starts singing into a microphone with a knife attached to the end. After the second chorus, he then brings out a variety of flamethrowers, and roasts the bottom of the pot. Finally, Flake escapes the pot, and Till chases him off the stage. They then return to the stage for "Du hast". Midway through the bridge of the song, a roadie brings out a crossbow, as Till picks it up, aims and fires, sending fireworks shooting above the audience, causing a series of explosions. They then stop, and start playing "Sonne", which is accompanied by twenty-foot theatrical flames, around the audience. They then finish the set with "Ohne dich", during which sparks rain down over Till. They then leave the stage, as a graphic on the screen shows a smartphone turning on the flashlight, encouraging the audience to do the same.

The band then appears on a small stage in the middle of the stadium, with their opening act Duo Jatekok, and play a piano version of "Engel". Flake, Schneider, Paul, Oliver and Richard return to the main stage via inflatable rubber life rafts where they are greeted by Till, at which point they delve into their first encore and play "Ausländer". Next is "Du riechst so gut", where Till shoots a bow shooting sparks. They finish the first encore with "Pussy", where midway through the song, Till mounts a phallic cannon that shoots white foam on the audience. After getting off the cannon, confetti starts shooting out over the audience. The band then leaves the stage.

After a long pause, the band come back onto the stage for their second encore, and start playing "Rammstein". They finish with "Ich will", during which, huge bursts of flame shoot up into the sky from the very top of the stage. The band then stops playing, and they don a curtsey (as is customary for them) at the bottom of the stage, before Till stands up and thanks the audience for their support, and the band finally leave the stage by way of a lift. The show ends how it began, with another explosion.

Shows

Cancelled shows

Notes

References 

Rammstein concert tours
2019 concert tours
2022 concert tours
2023 concert tours
Concert tours postponed due to the COVID-19 pandemic